Subrata Bhattacharya is an Indian football manager and former professional footballer who played as a defender for India national team and spent 17 years playing for Mohun Bagan. He was the stopper back for Mohun Bagan during 1975 IFA Shield final when East Bengal beat Mohun Bagan 5–0, the biggest ever margin in the Kolkata Derby. He won Indian National Football League for two times as a coach of Mohun Bagan. He was conferred with the Arjuna Award in 1989.

Playing career
As a defender, influenced by players like Jarnail Singh, Bhattacharya played for seventeen years for Mohun Bagan, from 1974 to 1990. In the club, he played under both the coaches, P. K. Banerjee and Amal Dutta. He became the Captain of Mohun Bagan in 1977; Mohun Bagan won the triple crown that season and became the first club to do so in Indian football history. He also led the side against a star-studded New York Cosmos spearheaded by Pelé on 24 September 1977; both the teams shared honours as the match ended 2–2. Under his captaincy, Mohun Bagan's performance against the American club featuring Pelé, Carlos Alberto Torres and Giorgio Chinaglia, earned popularity worldwide.

With Mohun Bagan, he won numerous trophies. They won Bordoloi Trophy with win against Mohammedan Sporting, and the "triple crown", IFA Shield, Durand Cup, and Rovers Cup.

The duel between him and Chima Okorie of East Bengal was a high point of Calcutta Football League in 80s, though he believes Majid Bishkar is the greatest foreigner to have played in Kolkata.

He was a pivotal part of the state team against PSV Eindhoven and Mohun Bagan in Mohun Bagans centenary celebration against a team led by Roger Milla.

Managerial career
During his coaching career, he managed all three Kolkata-giants East Bengal, Mohun Bagan and Mohammedan Sporting. He took charge of Mohun Bagan first in 2000 when the club was undergoing a period of transition, and signed few notable foreigners including Igor Shkvyrin from Uzbekistan, Sammy Omollo from Kenya, and Dusit Chalermsan from Thailand. In 2007, Bhattacharya was appointed head coach of East Bengal, but after their poor showing in the inaugural 2007–08 I-League, he resigned. He also managed then NFL side Tollygunge Agragami in 2003. From 2014 to 2018, he served as technical director of Prayag United.

In 2015, Bhattacharya fought against Satyajit Chatterjee for the post of football secretary in Mohun Bagan club election and was defeated by more than 2000 votes. In May 2018, it was officially announced that Bhattacharya was appointed head coach of another Kolkata based club Bhawanipore. After unveiled new coach, he quoted "I am joining Bhawanipore instead of Tollygunge Agragami. They are offering me a better package so I decided to join them. The management has agreed that the team would practice in Kalyani instead of Kolkata. So from the first week of June, we will start preparing for the season in Kalyani." In 2019, he joined Mohammedan Sporting as technical director.

Personal life
Bhattacharya is father of actor Saheb Bhattacharya, who appears in Bengali films. His daughter Sonam is married to Sunil Chhetri, who captains India, and is the country's all time top goal scorer.

In October 2022, Bhattacharya was admitted to a city hospital after suffering from dengue.

Honours

As player
Mohun Bagan
Federation Cup: 1978, 1980, 1981, 1982, 1986, 1987
Durand Cup: 1974, 1977, 1979, 1980, 1982, 1984, 1985, 1986
IFA Shield: 1976, 1977, 1978, 1979, 1981, 1982, 1987, 1989
Rovers Cup: 1976, 1977, 1981, 1985, 1988
Calcutta Football League: 1976, 1978, 1979, 1983, 1984, 1986, 1990

Bengal
 Santosh Trophy: 1986

Individual
 Arjuna Award: 1991
 Banga Bibhushan: 2018 (by the Government of West Bengal)
 Mohun Bagan Ratna: 2017

As manager
Mohun Bagan
 National Football League: 1999–2000, 2001–02

See also 
 List of one-club men in association football
 List of association football families

References

Further reading

External links

Subrata Bhattacharya stats at RSSSF
Subrata Bhattacharya at Khel Now (archived)

Living people
Indian footballers
India international footballers
1984 AFC Asian Cup players
People from North 24 Parganas district
Footballers from West Bengal
1953 births
Association football defenders
Mohun Bagan AC players
East Bengal Club managers
Calcutta Football League players
Recipients of the Arjuna Award
Indian football managers
Mohammedan SC (Kolkata) managers
Tollygunge Agragami FC managers
Footballers at the 1978 Asian Games
Asian Games competitors for India